Bastard is the sixth studio album by Colin Newman, lead singer of post-punk band Wire. It was released in 1997 on Newman's label Swim ~.

The album is almost entirely instrumental, with tracks largely built from guitar loops and samples. The first pressing of the album was packaged with a free copy of Newman's four-track Voice EP. Despite Newman's name being on the cover, he has stated that these releases, along with several others on Swim ~, are essentially collaborative efforts with his wife and musical partner, Malka Spigel.

Critical reception 
The album received mostly positive reviews. Jim Derogatis and Wilson Neate, writing in Trouser Press, called the album "an attractive, subtle hybrid of melodic electronica and rock". John Bush, writing for AllMusic, called Bastard "a mighty progression" from the previous album It Seems, "with no concessions to song-based forms, but instead a willingness to use those styles to create diverting music." Franklin Bruno, in CMJ New Music Monthly, noted that the album reiterates Newman's longstanding interest in musical repetition and found the approach "intriguing", but also said that the music "doesn't exactly invite the listener in", likening the album to "a party after everyone's left".

Track listing

References

External links 
 

1997 albums
Colin Newman albums